The thirteenth season of Mad TV, an American sketch comedy series, originally aired in the United States on the Fox Network between September 15, 2007, and May 17, 2008.

Summary
The 13th season of Mad TV saw more changes in show format and cast members.

Repertory players Ike Barinholtz, Frank Caeti, and Nicole Randall Johnson and feature player Lisa Donovan were let go from the cast (Barinholtz left due to creative differences while Caeti, Johnson, and Donovan were fired). Johnny Sanchez (the first Latino male hired since season six's Nelson Ascencio) joined the cast as a repertory player, while Dan Oster, Anjelah Johnson, and Daheli Hall were hired as feature players.

The show format had also undergone major changes. Brian Fairlee giving an episode preview was phased out and replaced with the return of the cold opening sketches (mostly music video parodies, fake commercials, mock movie trailers, and TV show promos). John Crane and Bruce Leddy—the series showrunners, head writers, and executive producers — directed most of the episodes. The show itself was relocated to a new studio (The Henry Fonda Music Box Theater) in order to give the show the feel of a live event, due in part to FOX's extensive budget cuts and competition from Saturday Night Live and its growing popularity from The Lonely Island's "Digital Shorts" on that show. MADtv'''s pretaped sketches shown this season were very minimal, using little to no elaborate props, settings, or costumes.

Between November 24 and February 2, MADtv became one of many scripted, current (at the time) television shows to be put on hiatus due to the 2007-2008 Writers Guild of America strike. Even though the strike did not end until February 12, 2008, three "new" episodes aired on February 2, February 9, and February 16. These "new" episodes were little more than pretaped sketches from canceled episodes and repeats of old sketches from seasons eight to ten (with no segments from the Music Box Theater). The show returned to its normal format on March 29, 2008.

This season was also the first of only two seasons to have "Best of..." clip shows a la Saturday Night Live, four of which aired prior to the show's official season premiere: Mad TV Ruined My Life (where Nicole Parker appears on a fictional episode of The Jerry Springer Show to defend the audience's claims that the sketch show's raunchy and politically incorrect sketches have traumatized and disgusted them), Survivor: Mad TV (where Jeff Probst and Keegan-Michael Key host a collection of the show's best TV and movie parodies), I Want My Mad TV (Perez Hilton and Bobby Lee's Johnny Gan character host a collection of MADtv's best celebrity caricatures and swipes at pop culture), and Mad TV's Most Wanted (where Michael McDonald and Susan Sarandon host a collection of the show's best recurring sketches and characters).

Notable celebrity appearances this season (besides the ones from the clip show episodes) include: Carlos Mencia, Neil Patrick Harris, Dave Navarro, John Reep, Kathy Griffin, Serena Williams, and former MADtv cast members Debra Wilson and Mo Collins.

 Opening montage 

The opening title sequence for season thirteen has been dramatically redesigned. Rather than show pictures of the cast, the cast are seen around Los Angeles, similar to how Saturday Night Live has opening sequences featuring its cast members around New York City. The original Mad TV'' song used for the previous twelve seasons has been completely replaced by an instrumental rock guitar version. The show also has a new announcer.

Cast

Repertory cast members
 Crista Flanagan  (12/16 episodes) 
 Keegan-Michael Key  (13/16 episodes) 
 Bobby Lee  (13/16 episodes) 
 Michael McDonald  (13/16 episodes) 
 Arden Myrin  (12/16 episodes) 
 Nicole Parker  (13/16 episodes) 
 Jordan Peele  (12/16 episodes) 
 Johnny Sanchez  (12/16 episodes) 

Featured cast members
 Daheli Hall  (5/16 episodes) 
 Anjelah Johnson  (4/16 episodes) 
 Dan Oster  (9/16 episodes)

Episodes

Home Release
Season 13 is available on HBO Max and is one of the few seasons to have no episodes skipped over due to copyright issues.

References

External links 

 Mad TV - Official Website
 

13
2007 American television seasons
2008 American television seasons